Moonflower is a double album released in 1977 by Santana. The recording features both studio and live tracks, which are interspersed with one another throughout the album. It is perhaps the group's most popular live album, because the 1974 album Lotus did not receive a U.S. domestic release until 1991. It displays a mix between the fusion of Latin and blues rock styles of the late 1960s and early 1970s, and the much more experimental and spiritual jazz fusion sound that characterized the band's mid-1970s work. The live material was recorded during the supporting tour for the Amigos album.

A cover version of the Zombies' mid-1960s hit song "She's Not There" was released as a single and peaked at #27. The song was the first Santana recording to hit the Top 40 of the Billboard charts since "No One to Depend On" reached #36 in 1972. The album reached #10 on the Billboard charts and was eventually certified platinum, neither of which occurred again until the star-studded Supernatural in 1999.

Track listing
All tracks written and composed by Tom Coster and Carlos Santana, except where noted;

Side one
 "Dawn/Go Within"  – 2:44 (Studio)
 "Carnaval"  – 2:17 (Live)
 "Let the Children Play" (Leon Patillo, Santana) – 2:37 (Live)
 "Jugando" (José "Chepito" Areas, Santana) – 2:09 (Live)
 "I'll Be Waiting" (Santana) – 5:20 (Studio; also issued on single)
 "Zulu" – 3:25 (Studio)

Side two
 "Bahia" – 1:37 (Studio)
 "Black Magic Woman/Gypsy Queen" (Peter Green/Gábor Szabó) – 6:32 (Live)
 "Dance Sister Dance (Baila Mi Hermana)" (Leon "Ndugu" Chancler, Coster, David Rubinson) – 7:45 (Live)
 "Europa (Earth's Cry Heaven's Smile)"  – 6:07 (Live)

Side three
 "She's Not There" (Rod Argent) – 4:09 (Studio; also issued on single)
 "Flor d'Luna (Moonflower)" (Coster) – 5:01 (Studio)
 "Soul Sacrifice/Head, Hands & Feet" (Santana, Gregg Rolie, David Brown, Marcus Malone, Graham Lear) – 14:01 (Live)

Side four
 "El Morocco" – 5:05 (Studio)
 "Transcendance" (Santana) – 5:13 (Studio) 
 "Savor/Toussaint L'Overture" (Santana, Rolie, Brown, Michael Carabello, Michael Shrieve, Areas) – 12:56 (Live)

Bonus tracks on 2003 reissue
 "Black Magic Woman" (Single edit) (Green) – 2:37 (Live)
 "I'll Be Waiting" (Single edit) (Santana) – 3:12 (Studio)
 "She's Not There" (Single edit) (Argent)  – 3:19 (Studio)

Personnel

 Greg Walker – vocals
 Carlos Santana – guitar, vocals, percussion
 Tom Coster – keyboards
 Pablo Tellez – bass, vocals (live tracks)
 David Margen – bass (studio tracks)
 Graham Lear – drums
 Raul Rekow – percussion
 José "Chepito" Areas – percussion (live tracks)
 Pete Escovedo – percussion (studio tracks)
 Tommy Coster – keyboards on "Zulu"

Charts

Certifications

References

Santana (band) albums
Albums produced by Carlos Santana
Columbia Records albums
1977 live albums
Santana (band) live albums
Columbia Records live albums
1977 albums